McKibbon House is a historic mansion in Montevallo, Alabama, U.S..

History
The house was built for Robert Fulton McKibbon in 1900, and designed in the Queen Anne architectural style. It served as a meeting place for the Montevallo Presbyterian Church, as Fulton was a staunch Presbyterian. In 1944, it was purchased by J. W. D. Galloway, only to be purchased by Melvin T.  Smitherman in 1952. It was purchased by Leonard Lawley in 1968.

Architectural significance
The house has been listed on the Alabama Register of Landmarks and Heritage since 1978, and on the National Register of Historic Places since December 31, 2001.

References

Houses on the National Register of Historic Places in Alabama
National Register of Historic Places in Shelby County, Alabama
Queen Anne architecture in Alabama
Houses completed in 1900
Houses in Shelby County, Alabama
Properties on the Alabama Register of Landmarks and Heritage
1900 establishments in Alabama